Diego de Contreras (1562–1618) was a Roman Catholic prelate who served as the Archbishop of Santo Domingo (1612–1618).

Biography
Diego de Contreras was born in Mexico and ordained a priest in the Order of St. Augustine. On 18 June 1612, he was appointed by the King of Spain and confirmed by Pope Paul V as Archbishop of Santo Domingo. On 10 November 1613, he was consecrated bishop by Juan Pérez de la Serna, Archbishop of México. He served as Archbishop of Santo Domingo until his death on 24 April 1618. While bishop, he was the principal consecrator of Pedro de Solier y Vargas, Bishop of Puerto Rico.

References

External links and additional sources
 (for Chronology of Bishops) 
 (for Chronology of Bishops) 

1562 births
1618 deaths
Bishops appointed by Pope Paul V
Augustinian bishops
Roman Catholic archbishops of Santo Domingo
17th-century Roman Catholic archbishops in the Dominican Republic